5001 Nights at the Movies: A Guide from A to Z, first published in 1982, is a book compiling passages of film critic Pauline Kael's reviews from the silent era to the early 1980s. They were originally written for The New Yorker’s 'Goings On About Town' section.

Summary 
In her regular New Yorker column Kael wrote long, thoughtful critiques of the latest films. 5001 Nights is made up of abbreviated reviews of those longer articles and capsule critiques of dozens of other movies made throughout the 20th century in a single paragraph.

Kael recaps American and international films; her reviews often contain a phrase that captures a film’s essence.

Excerpts 
In a Lonely Place: "an atmospheric but disappointingly hollow murder melodrama"
Rebel Without a Cause: "had more emotional resonance for the teenagers of the time than many much better movies"
Written on the Wind: "his talent for whipping up sour, stylized soap operas in posh settings"
The Tarnished Angels: "the kind of bad movie that you know is bad-and yet you're held by the mixture of polished style and quasi-melodramatics achieved by the director, Douglas Sirk"
Gun Crazy: "In its B-movie way, it has a fascinating crumminess"
New York, New York: "an honest failure...the improvisational Cassavetes-like psychodrama seems hollow and makes it uneasy"
Raging Bull: "He loses the lowlife entertainment value of prizefight films; he aestheticizes pulp and kills it" 
Au Hasard Balthazar: "Considered a masterpiece by some, but others may find it painstakingly tedious and offensively holy"
Red Desert: "Boredom in Ravenna, and it seeps into the viewer's bones"
The Wrong Man: "an unusually drab Hitchcock film"

Expanded version 
Owl Books republished the guide a year after her death with 800 reviews of films from the late 80s-early 90s.

References

External links
Amazon.com
Spectrum Culture review
Flick Attack review
Excerpt
Goodreads

1982 non-fiction books
Books of film criticism
Books about film
Books by Pauline Kael
American non-fiction books
Holt, Rinehart and Winston books